Konomi (written: 好美 or このみ in hiragana) is a feminine Japanese given name. Notable people with the name include:

, Japanese bobsledder
, Japanese long jumper
, Japanese voice actress
, Japanese voice actress
, Japanese singer 
, Japanese footballer
, Japanese sprinter
, Japanese footballer
, Japanese child actress

Konomi (written: 許斐) is also a Japanese surname. Notable people with the surname include:

, Japanese manga artist

Japanese feminine given names
Japanese-language surnames